Pistaccio Metallic is the fifth album by Croatian band The Beat Fleet (TBF), released in 2011. The album was announced in late May with the release of the lead single "Mater". The album has sold in more than 50,000 copies in Balkan.

Background

Unlike previous studio albums by TBF, Pistaccio Metallic was released by Dallas Records. It is also the first studio album that feature new drummer Janko Novoselić. He also played on their 2010 live album Perpetuum Fritule. For the first time TBF recorded a studio album outside of their home town Split. The album was recorded in Novo Mesto in Slovenia at the RSL Studio. It is also the first time TBF produced a studio album themselves without an external producer. The album got its name from the band's inside joke about the color of the guitar - however, Badovinac claimed in an interview that TBF always creates "wacky" album name, which is often nonsensical.

Track listing

 	Tragični Junak	
 	San	
 	Spin Doktor	
 	Uvik Kontra	
 	Mater	
 	Grad Spava	
 	Vrag (Dobar Dan Profesore Voland)	
 	Dalmatino	
 	Veseljko	
 	Pozitivan Stav	
 	Uspavanka

References

Sources
 Muzika.hr - U prodaji "Pistaccio Metallic" TBF-a
 Novi singl TBF-a – Vijesti — MTV Hrvatska

2011 albums
The Beat Fleet albums